Sivert Paulsen Bratberg (11 June 1780 – 27 June 1816) was a Norwegian farmer and teacher. He served as a representative at the Norwegian Constitutional Assembly.  

Sivert Pålsson Bratberg was born on Bratberg øvre, a farm near the village of Beitstad at Steinkjer in Nord-Trøndelag, Norway. He was schooled by his parish priest. Bratberg became a schoolteacher in the village of Dalbygda in Leksvik. He later became a farmer on a farm in Velle near his native village. He married Marit Haagensdatter Holte (1777–1834) in 1804. The couple were the parents of two children. He died accidentally at his farm during the summer of 1816 after being kicked by a horse.

Sivert Bratberg represented Nordre Trondhjems amt (now Nord-Trøndelag) at the Norwegian Constituent Assembly in 1814, together with Hans Christian Ulrik Midelfart and Hieronymus Heyerdahl. Here he generally supported the position of the independence party (Selvstendighetspartiet).

References

External links
Representantene på Eidsvoll 1814 (Cappelen Damm AS)
 Men of Eidsvoll (eidsvollsmenn)

Related Reading
Holme Jørn (2014) De kom fra alle kanter - Eidsvollsmennene og deres hus  (Oslo: Cappelen Damm) 

1780 births
1816 deaths
People from Steinkjer
Fathers of the Constitution of Norway
Norwegian farmers
Accidental deaths in Norway
Horse-related accidents and incidents